Parevia vulmaria is a moth of the subfamily Arctiinae first described by William Schaus in 1924. It is found in Brazil.

References

Phaegopterina
Moths described in 1924